Typhlodromina is a genus of mites in the Phytoseiidae family.

Species
 Typhlodromina conspicua (Garman, 1948)
 Typhlodromina eharai Muma & Denmark, 1969
 Typhlodromina musero (Schicha, 1987)
 Typhlodromina subtropica Muma & Denmark, 1969
 Typhlodromina tropica (Chant, 1959)

References

Phytoseiidae